Randeep Rai (born 8 June 1993) is an Indian actor. He started his acting career in 2014 by portraying Kabir Scindia in Channel V's O Gujariya: Badlein Chal Duniya. Rai is best known for his portrayal as Sameer Maheshwari in Sony TV's Yeh Un Dinon Ki Baat Hai. He was also seen as Anand Rawal in Colors TV's Balika Vadhu 2 and as Raghav in Sony TV's Bade Achhe Lagte Hain 2.

Early life
Rai has appeared in more than 120 TV commercials before pursuing his career in acting.

Career
Rai started his acting career in 2014 by playing Kabir Scindia in Channel V's O Gujariya: Badlein Chal Duniya, which was followed by episodic roles in Bindass's Yeh Hai Aashiqui, Emotional Atyachar, Channel V's Secret Diaries: The Hidden Chapters, Code Red Talaash, Pyaar Tune Kya Kiya, Tujhse Naaraz Nahin Zindagi, Fear Files: Darr Ki Sacchi Tasvirein and Big F. 

In 2016, he played Aryan Rathi in Diya Aur Baati Hum.

From 2017 to 2019, Rai portrayed Sameer Maheshwari in Sony TV's Yeh Un Dinon Ki Baat Hai. 

In 2019, Rai made his film debut with a cameo in Pranaam as Rahul.

In November 2021, Rai returned to television with Colors TV's Balika Vadhu 2 as Anand.

Since February 2023, Rai is portraying Raghav opposite Niti Taylor in Sony TV's Bade Achhe Lagte Hain 2.

Filmography

Television

Special appearances

Films

Web series

Music videos

Awards and nominations

References

External links

 
 

1993 births
Living people